Aidu may refer to:

Aidu, Ida-Viru County, village in Maidla Parish, Ida-Viru County
Aidu, Jõgeva County, village in Pajusi Parish, Jõgeva County
Aidu, Viljandi County, village in Paistu Parish, Viljandi County

See also
Aizu, third of Fukushima Prefecture, Japan